Floydian Slip is a weekly, one-hour syndicated radio program produced by Random Precision Media LLC (RPM), exclusively devoted to the music and history of the British rock band Pink Floyd. The show has an affiliate base of around one hundred stations.

History 
The show is created and hosted by Craig Bailey of Shelburne, Vermont, who aired his first episode in January 1989 on Ithaca College's carrier current station 106-VIC (now called VIC Radio) in Ithaca, N.Y., as a senior Television-Radio major at the college. He also produced it for Burlington's short-lived WEXP-FM (105.1) in 1994, and for more than 13 years at WCPV (101.3) until June 7, 2009. In August 2009, Bailey began marketing the show to stations as a weekly syndicated offering, creating RPM to do so.

Sources

 
 
 

American music radio programs